Kieran John Callinan (born 21 January 1986), known by his stage name Kirin J. Callinan, is an Australian singer, songwriter, and guitarist. He is also a founding member of Mercy Arms and has played with the Night Game, Jack Ladder and the Dreamlanders, Mark Ronson and Genesis Owusu.

Referred to as the enfant terrible of Australia's underground rock music scene, Callinan is known for his flamboyant public persona, confrontational live shows, and diverse musical output in which, according to Spin, "the distinctions between talent, irony, and genuine bad taste bleed together until they’re indistinguishable." Callinan said that his primary motivation as a musician is to "excite and confuse, ... But you can't do that for any length of time without having sincerity."

Callinan has collaborated with a wide range of musicians, including Mark Ronson, Jimmy Barnes, James Chance, Alex Cameron, Connan Mockasin, Weyes Blood, Pond, Hubert Lenoir, Genesis Owusu, whistler Molly Lewis and brothers Neil and Tim Finn. Barnes, Cameron and Lewis feature in Callinan's 2017 single "Big Enough"; Barnes' distinctive screaming cameo became an internet meme.

Early life 
Kieran John Callinan was born and raised in Sydney. His father is Brendan Callinan, former keyboardist with Australian pub rock band The Radiators.

Music career

2005–2007: Early years and Mercy Arms

In 2005, he formed indie rock band Mercy Arms with fellow guitarist and vocalist Thom Moore, bassist Ash Moss, and drummer Julian Sudek. Callinan and Sudek had lived in the same area: "We played soccer against each other and with each other as kids, so we go back to when we were fourteen years old or so." Mercy Arms broke up in 2009, on stage at the Perth Big Day Out.

Kirin was also an early member of Sydney post punk band The Valentinos, their first ep produced by later Kirin J collaborator and Embracism producer Kim Moyes of The Presets.

2008–present: Solo career 
In 2008, Callinan self-released his debut solo album, Am I a Woman, Yet?. His second album, Embracism, was released by American record label Terrible Records and London based XL Recordings in 2013, making him only the second Australian artist at the time to release an album with the prestigious UK label, after The Avalanches.

In 2017, Callinan released Bravado. It reached No. 5 on the ARIA Hitseekers Albums Chart.  His track, "S.A.D.", was provided with a music video directed by Danny Cohen, which was nominated for Best Video at the ARIA Music Awards of 2017.

In February 2018, Callinan received a 12-month good-behaviour bond after being charged with willful and obscene exposure in a public place. He lifted his kilt on the red carpet at the ARIA Music Awards of 2017, briefly exposing his genitals to press photographers. Following the incident, Callinan was dropped from the 2018 lineup of Laneway Music Festival.

In 2019, Callinan released Return to Center. Writing for the Sydney Morning Herald, music journalist Michael Dwyer declared "Kirin J Callinan has just purloined the concept album of the century".

Callinan has contributed & collaborated both live and on record with a number of other artists. Since 2009 he has been an original touring member of Jack Ladder & The Dreamlanders, contributing guitars on the 2009 live ep "Counterfeits" as well as full length albums "Hurtsville" (2011), "Playmates" (2014), "Blue Poles" (2018) and 2021’s "Hijack!". He also played guitars on Mark Ronson’s Grammy Award winning album "Uptown Special", performing songs from the album including lead singles "Uptown Funk" and "Leaving Los Feliz" live alongside Ronson and Tame Impala’s Kevin Parker.

2019 saw Callinan co-writing & producing songs in a production duo alongside Mac Demarco, producing Julian Casablancas & The Voidz singles "Did My Best" and "The Eternal Tao 2.0" and working on Hubert Lenoir’s second LP "PICTURA DE IPSE : Musique Direct" among others.

Back in Australia, Callinan also begun working alongside Australian / Ghanaian rapper Genesis Owusu, co-writing 2021’s "Smiling With No Teeth" album, contributing vocals and guitar. Smiling With No Teeth would go on to win Album of the Year, Best Hip Hop Release, and Best Independent Release at the 2021 ARIA Awards as well as the J Award for Australian Album of the Year  and, in March 2022, win the Australian Music Prize and Best Record at the 2022 Rolling Stone Australia Awards.

In 2021, Callinan launched his own record label - Worse Records - a subsidiary of US label Terrible Records, releasing French Canadian artist Hubert Lenoir’s 2022 Polaris Prize shortlisted sophomore album PICTURA DE IPSE : Musique Direct as well as one off single "New Music Friday", by his own manufactured conceptual boy band "Seconds Flat" and Jack Ladder & The Dreamlanders lead single "Astronaut" from the album "Hijack!", contributing musically to each release, as well co-directing the music videos for both "Astronaut" and "New Music Friday" alongside then girlfriend, model and filmmaker Lilian Sumner and Australian director Oliver Birt respectively.

On Valentine’s Day, 14 February 2022, Kirin released the first single "…in ABSOLUTES" and its accompanying music video co-directed with Kiwi director Oscar Keys, apparently shot in Kirin’s New Zealand residence. It is rumoured to be from his upcoming 5th solo album.

Acting
In 2017, Callinan was cast by Jane Campion in the second season of Top of the Lake. "Kirin was a joy to work with because he was imaginative, playful and exploring," said Campion. "He seems somehow to push the limits of human being in the biggest sense, like he might have been raised by unicorns."

Discography

Albums

Backing band 
Current

 Jack Ladder - Theremin (2021 – present)

Former

 Tex Crick – Synthesizer, Bass Guitar, Backing Vocals (2013–2020)
 Mahne Frame - Drums, Percussion, Backing Vocals (2016-2020)
 John Carroll Kirby - Keyboards (2018)
 David Jenkins Jnr. - Drums, Percussion (2013-2016)
 Daniel Stricker - Drums (2007-2012)
 Hannes Kaschell - Drums (2015)
 Tim Koh - Bass Guitar (2015)
 Jaie Gonzales - Bass Guitar (2013-2014)
 Molly Lewis - Musical Whistling (2017)

Awards

AIR Awards
The Australian Independent Record Awards (commonly known informally as AIR Awards) is an annual awards night to recognise, promote and celebrate the success of Australia's Independent Music sector.

|-
| AIR Awards of 2013
|themselves
| Breakthrough Independent Artist
|

ARIA Music Awards
The ARIA Music Awards is an annual awards ceremony that recognises excellence, innovation, and achievement across all genres of Australian music. 

! 
|-
| 2017
| "S.A.D." (directed by Danny Cohen) 
| Best Video
| 
|

Australian Music Prize
The Australian Music Prize (the AMP) is an annual award of $30,000 given to an Australian band or solo artist in recognition of the merit of an album released during the year of award. The commenced in 2005.

|-
| 2013
| Embracism
| Australian Music Prize
| 
|-

J Award
The J Awards are an annual series of Australian music awards that were established by the Australian Broadcasting Corporation's youth-focused radio station Triple J. They commenced in 2005.

|-
| J Awards of 2012
| "Way II War"
| Australian Video of the Year
| 
|-
| J Awards of 2017
| "Big Enough"
| Australian Video of the Year
| 
|-

National Live Music Awards
The National Live Music Awards (NLMAs) are a broad recognition of Australia's diverse live industry, celebrating the success of the Australian live scene. The awards commenced in 2016.

|-
| National Live Music Awards of 2016
| Kirin J. Callinan
| Live Guitarist of the Year
|

References

External links

 

21st-century Australian singers
Alternative rock singers
Australian indie rock musicians
Australian multi-instrumentalists
Australian rock guitarists
Australian rock singers
Australian singer-songwriters
Living people
1986 births
Musicians from Sydney
21st-century guitarists
21st-century Australian male singers
Australian male guitarists
Australian male singer-songwriters